Motor Lublin is a Polish professional football team based in Lublin. The club was founded in December 1950 with their nickname The Yellow, White and Blues reflecting their official colours. They compete in II liga in the 2021–22 season.

Historical names 
(till  1950) Metalowiec
(since 1950) Stal FSC Lublin
(since 1957) Robotniczy Klub Sportowy Motor Lublin
(since 1998)  Lubelski Klub Piłkarski
(since 2001)  LKP Motor Lublin

History 

The history of Motor Lublin dates back to December 1950, when a group of sports enthusiasts decided to form a football team, supported by FSC Lublin Automotive Factory. Motor was at first called Stal (Steel) Lublin, and its team began playing in the lower level of Polish football tier (also called Class B). After one year, the team won promotion to Class A, which was the equivalent of the 4th Division. In the spring of 1953, Stal FSC Lublin debuted in the third level, the so-called Lublin-Rzeszów Inter-Voivodeship Class (Lubelsko-Rzeszowska Klasa Miedzywojewodzka), but was relegated after one year.

Stal FSC returned to the third level in 1955, and in 1957, the club changed its name into Robotniczy Klub Sportowy (Workers’ Sports Club) Motor. In 1960, Polish leagues switched to the autumn-spring system, and in August 1961, Motor lost playoffs against Start Łódź, failing to qualify to the Second Division. In 1964, Motor became the champion of the Lublin region, and in the playoffs, it beat Włókniarz Łódz, Warszawianka Warszawa, Mazur Ełk and Warmia Olsztyn. The team did not qualify, as two of its games were voided, because one of Motor’s players was not registered.

In the 1964/65 season, Motor once again won local championships, qualifying to the playoffs. Since both Motor and CKS Czeladź finished in the first position in the playoff round, an additional game was necessary between the two teams. This game took place on August 5, 1965 in Łódź. Supported by 7,000 fans, Motor won 3–0, winning promotion to the second level of Polish football. Motor was relegated after one season, but in the early summer of 1968, it returned to the Second Division, to remain there until 1972.

In 1973, Polish Football Association decided to form two groups of the Second Division, with 16 teams in each. This decision helped Motor, as it won promotion, and in the 1973/74 season, the team from Lublin was a success, almost winning promotion to the Ekstraklasa. For the remaining part of the 1970s, Motor remained one of the top teams of the Second Division. Finally, in the 1979/80 season, Motor, with manager Bronisław Waligóra, won promotion to the top level of Polish football system. The team from Lublin finished the 1980–81 Ekstraklasa in the 10th position, and in the 1981–82 Ekstraklasa, it was the last. After relegation, most of the players remained in Lublin. Motor also played in the 1982 Intertoto Cup, against Lyngby Boldklub, MSV Duisburg and FC Lucerne.

In the 1982/83 season of the Second Division, Motor under manager Lesław Ćmikiewicz had its biggest rival in the team of Resovia Rzeszów. After 28 games, Resovia was ahead of Motor, with just one point. On June 19, 1983, in Lublin, with 30,000 people in the stands, Motor routed Resovia 4–0, and once again won promotion to the Ekstraklasa to remain there until June 1987 (see 1986–87 Ekstraklasa). Motor returned to the Ekstraklasa in August 1989, after winning the play-offs against Pogoń Szczecin (2–3, 2–0). It remained in Polish top division for three years, to be relegated in the 1991–92 Ekstraklasa. In June 1996, Motor was relegated to the Third Division, and two years later, to the fourth level. In the meantime, to escape debts, it changed the name into Lublin Football Club (Lubelski Klub Pilkarski, LKP). This name remained in use until 2001, when it was changed into Lublin Football Club Motor.

Honours 

Top division
 9 seasons in the top division:
1980–81
1981–82
1983–84
1984–85
1985–86
1986–87
1989–90
1990–91
1991–92

2nd division
 22 seasons in the 2nd division:
1965–66
1968–69 – 1971–72
1973–74 – 1979–80
1982–83
1987–88 – 1988–89
1992–93 – 1995–96
2007–08 – 2009–10

 Polish Cup
 Quarterfinals in 1978–79, 1981–82, and 2022-23
Polish U-19 Champion: 1971
 Polish U-19 Bronze Medal: 1970, 1976
 UEFA Intertoto CupParticipants''' in 1982 – played against Lyngby BK, MSV Duisburg and FC Luzern

Stadium 

Motor Lublin currently plays at Arena Lublin with a capacity of 15,500 spectators.

Supporters and rivalries 
Motor supporters have friendly relations with fans of Śląsk Wrocław, Górnik Łęczna and Hetman Zamość. Their traditional rivals were city rivals KS Lublinianka, although this rivalry is no longer upheld. They have local rivalries with Avia Świdnik, Stal Stalowa Wola, and Radomiak Radom. Motor fans have rivalries with fans of many higher division teams too such as Widzew Łódź, Lechia Gdańsk and both the Kraków teams, Wisła, and Cracovia.

Players

Current squad

Out on loan

References

External links 
  Official website
  Unofficial website

 
Football clubs in Lublin
Association football clubs established in 1950
1950 establishments in Poland